Aleksandr Yatsko (born 1978) is a Russian football player.

Aleksandr Yatsko may also refer to:
   Aleksandr Yatsko (actor) (born 1958),   Russian theater and film actor